William Woodbury Wells (1860 – January 5, 1901) was a teacher, lawyer and political figure in New Brunswick, Canada. He represented Westmorland County in the Legislative Assembly of New Brunswick from 1892 to 1899 as a Liberal member.

He was born in Point de Bute, New Brunswick, the son of Charles C. Wells. Wells married a Miss Turner. He was principal of the Superior School at Port Elgin. Wells was admitted to practice as a barrister in 1893. He died in office in 1901.

References 
The Canadian parliamentary companion, 1897 JA Gemmill

1860 births
1901 deaths
New Brunswick Liberal Association MLAs
People from Westmorland County, New Brunswick